Daniel Devitt (1916 - September 2003) was an Irish hurler. His championship career with the Dublin senior team lasted seven seasons from 1939 until 1945.

Honours

Faughs
Dublin Senior Hurling Championship (7): 1936, 1939, 1940, 1941, 1944, 1945, 1946

Dublin
Leinster Senior Hurling Championship (3): 1941, 1942, 1944

References

1916 births
2003 deaths
Faughs hurlers
Dublin inter-county hurlers
Leinster inter-provincial hurlers